Gap junction beta-1 protein (GJB1), also known as connexin 32 (Cx32) is a transmembrane protein that in humans is encoded by the GJB1 gene. Gap junction beta-1 protein is a member of the gap junction connexin family of proteins that regulates and controls the transfer of communication signals across cell membranes, primarily in the liver and peripheral nervous system.

Mutations of the GJB1 gene affecting the signalling of and trafficking through gap junctions, resulting in an inherited peripheral neuropathy called X-linked Charcot-Marie-Tooth Disease. Complications include the demyelination of oligodendrocytes and Schwann cells, causing delayed transmission rates of nerve communication in the peripheral nervous system, due to irregularities in the normal function of the cells. This condition leads to a number of symptoms, most commonly muscle weakness and sensory problems in the outer extremities of the limbs. As a result, muscle atrophy and soft tissue injuries due to delayed nerve transmission can occur. In males, due to the hemizygousity of the X-chromosome, the symptoms and issues surrounding X-linked Charcot-Marie-Tooth disease are more prevalent.

Function 
Connexins are membrane-spanning proteins that assemble to form gap junction channels that facilitate the transfer of ions and small molecules between cells. For a general discussion of connexin proteins, see GJB2.

In melanocytic cells GJB1 gene expression may be regulated by MITF.

Gene 
The gene that encodes the human GJB1 protein is found on the X chromosome, on the long arm at position q13.1, in interval 8, from base pair 71,215,212 to base pair 71,225,215.

Mutations 
Approximately four hundred type X Charcot-Marie-Tooth causing mutations have been identified within the GJB1 gene, and it is the only known gene to be associated with this disease,. The majority of these mutations only change a single amino acid within the protein chain, which result in a different protein being produced. Mutations within the GJB1 gene consist of novel, missense, double-missense, amino acid deletion, nonsense, frameshift, and in-frame deletions/insertions. These mutations most commonly result in proteins that work incorrectly, less effectively, degrade faster, are not present in adequate numbers or may not function at all.

Structure 
The GJB1 gene is approximately 10kb in length, with one coding exon and three non-coding exons. GJB1 is a gap junction, beta 1 protein also identified as connexin 32, with 238 amino acids. This protein contains four transmembrane domains, which when assembled form gap junctions. Each of these gap junctions consist of two hemichannels (connexions), which in turn consist of six connexin molecules (gap junction trans-membrane proteins)., This enables communication between Schwann cell nuclei and axons through a radial diffusion pathway.

Function 
GJB1 functions as a radial diffusion pathway, allowing the communication and diffusion of nutrients, ions and small molecules between cells. The GJB1 protein is found in a number of organs, including the liver, kidney, pancreas and nervous system.  In normal circumstances this protein is located in the cell membrane of Schwann cells and oligodendrocytes, specialised cells of the nervous system., These cells typically encapsulate nerves that are involved in the assembly and preservation of myelin, to ensure reliable and rapid transmission of nerve signals., Typically the GJB1 protein forms channels through the myelin to the internal Schwann cell or oligodendrocyte, allowing effective transportation and communication.,

Type X Charcot-Marie-Tooth disease 
Approximately four hundred mutations of the GJB1 gene have been identified in people with X-linked Charcot-Marie-Tooth disease (CMTX). CMTX is predominantly classified with symptoms related to muscle weakness and sensory problems, especially in the outer extremities of the limbs. CMTX is the second most common type of CMT (about 10% of all patients) and is transmitted as an x-linked dominant trait. It is categorised by the lack of male-to-male transmission of the mutated GJB1 gene and the differences in severity between heterozygous women and hemizygous men, with the later being more severely affected.

Most of the mutations of the GJB1 gene switch or change a single amino acid in the gap junction (connexin-32) protein, although some may result in a protein of irregular size. Some of these mutations also cause hearing loss in patients with CMTX. Currently it is unknown how the mutations of the GJB1 gene lead to these specific features of Charcot-Marie-Tooth disease, however it is theorised that the cause is due to the demyelination of nerve cells. As a result, transmission rates of nerve communication in the peripheral nervous system are delayed, which in turn would cause irregularities in the normal function of Schwann cells.

Whilst CMTX is more commonly known to affect the peripheral nervous system some cases have been reported in which there is evidence of demyelination of the central nervous system. These abnormalities whilst not presenting any symptoms were identified through nerve impulse and imaging studies, and are believed to also be caused through mutations on the GJB1 gene.

Diagnosis/testing 
Historically CMTX could only be diagnosed through symptoms or measurement of the speed of nerve impulses. With the creation of genetic testing, 90% of CMTX cases are now diagnosed using the mutations of the GJB1 (Cx32) gene. The genetic screening of families has also become common after the diagnosis of CMTX in a patient, to further identify other family members that may be suffering from the disease. This screening is also used systematically by researchers to identify new mutations within the gene.

Management 
Currently CMTX is an incurable condition, instead patients are evaluated and treated for symptoms caused by the disease. Treatment is limited to rehabilitative therapy, use of assistive devices such as orthoses and in some cases surgical treatment of skeletal deformities and soft-tissue abnormalities. Surgical treatment most commonly includes osteotomies, soft-tissue surgery (including tendon transfers) and/or joint fusions.

Genetic counseling 
Due to the nature of inheritance of CMTX, affected males will pass the GJB1 gene mutation to all female children and none of their male children, whilst females who are carriers will have a 50% chance of passing on the mutation to each of their offspring. With the development of genetic testing, it is possible to perform both prenatal and pre-implantation testing elected by the patient, when their type of mutation has been identified. Results from genetic testing can then be used to prevent the transmission of this disease to their offspring.

See also 
 Connexin
 Gap junction

References

Further reading

External links 
 GeneReviews/NCBI/NIH/UW entry on Charcot-Marie-Tooth Neuropathy X Type 1
 OMIM entries on Charcot-Marie-Tooth Neuropathy X Type 1
 

Cis-regulatory RNA elements
Connexins